USS Portent (AM-106) was an  acquired by the United States Navy for the dangerous task of removing mines from minefields laid in the water to prevent ships from passing.

Portent — a metal-hulled minesweeper — was named after the word "portent", something that foreshadows a coming event. In this case, it was an appropriate name since the Portent struck a mine and was sunk not long after her commissioning.
 
Portent was laid down on 15 November 1941 by the Pennsylvania Shipyards, Inc., Beaumont, Texas, launched on 16 August 1942, sponsored by Mrs. Arthur L. Kline, Jr., and commissioned on 3 April 1943.

North Atlantic World War II operations 
Portent sailed via Algiers, Louisiana, and Key West, Florida, to New York City to join a convoy to Casablanca and various North African ports on 14 May 1943. From May–November, she escorted convoys between New York City and Casablanca, Morocco. Assigned to a convoy entering the Mediterranean, she anchored outside Oran, Algeria on 22 November.

Sunk off the Italian coast
Deployed to Italy, she arrived at Naples on 19 December. Nearby ships rescued survivors.

Awards
Portent received one battle star for World War II service.

References

External links
Ships of the U.S. Navy, 1940-1945 AM-106 USS Portent
uboat.net - Minesweeper USS Portent of the Auk class
Naval Losses World War II
Photo gallery at navsource.org

 

Auk-class minesweepers of the United States Navy
Ships built in Port Arthur, Texas
1942 ships
World War II minesweepers of the United States
World War II shipwrecks in the Mediterranean Sea
Maritime incidents in January 1944
Ships sunk by mines